David Goffin and Pierre-Hugues Herbert were the defending champions, but Goffin chose to compete at the 2020 ATP Cup instead, while Herbert chose not to participate this week.

Rohan Bopanna and Wesley Koolhof won the title, defeating Luke Bambridge and Santiago González in the final, 3–6, 6–2, [10–6].

Seeds

Draw

Draw

References

External Links
Main Draw

Qatar ExxonMobil Open - Doubles
Doubles
Qatar Open (tennis)